Legislative elections were held in the Northern Region of Nigeria in May 1961.

Results

See also
1960 Western Region legislative election
1961 Eastern Region legislative election
1964 Mid-West Region legislative election

References

The Europa World Year Book 1965, Volume II, p. 873

Regional elections in Nigeria
Northern
1961 in Nigeria